Seán O'Leary-Hayes (born 16 July 1999) is an Irish hurler who plays for Cork Senior Championship club Midleton and at inter-county level with the Cork senior hurling team. He usually lines out as a full-back.

Playing career

Midleton CBS

O'Leary-Hayes played in all grades of hurling with Midleton CBS Secondary School before progressing onto the college's senior team. On 15 December 2016, he was at full-back when Midelton CBS defeated St. Colman's College from Fermoy by 0-11 to 0-10 to win the Dr. O'Callaghan Cup.

Midleton

O'Leary-Hayes joined the Midleton club at a young age and played in all grades at juvenile and underage levels. On 25 June 2017, he made his first appearance at senior level when he lined out at right wing-back in a 2-25 to 4-15 defeat of Erin's Own.

Cork

Minor and under-20

O'Leary-Hayes first played for Cork as a member of the minor team on 6 April 2016. He was at left corner-back for Cork's 0-17 to 1-10 defeat of Waterford in the 2016 Munster Championship.

O'Leary-Hayes moved to full-back and was appointed captain of the Cork minor hurling team for the 2017 Munster Championship. On 9 July, he scored a point from full-back when Cork defeated Clare by 4-21 to 0-16 to win the Munster Championship for the first time since 2008. On 3 September, O'Leary-Hayes captained Cork to a 2017 to 2-15 All-Ireland final defeat by Galway. He was later named in the full-back position on the inaugural Minor Star Awards Hurling Team of the Year.

On 3 July 2019, O'Leary-Hayes made his first appearance for Cork's inaugural under-20 team in the Munster Championship. He lined out at centre-back in the 1-20 to 0-16 defeat of Limerick. On 23 July 2019, O'Leary-Hayes was again at centre-back when Cork suffered a 3-15 to 2-17 defeat by Tipperary in the Munster final. He was selected at centre-back when Cork faced Tipperary for a second time in the All-Ireland final on 24 August 2019 but spent much of the game at left corner-back. O'Leary-Hayes ended the game on the losing side after a 5-17 to 1-18 defeat.

Senior

O'Leary-Hayes was called up to the Cork senior panel in late 2018 before making his debut on 2 January 2019 when he came on as a substitute in a 1-24 to 1-18 defeat by Waterford in the Munster League. He was later added to the panel for Cork's National Hurling League game against Clare.

Career statistics

Club

Inter-county

Honours

Cork
Munster Under-20 Hurling Championship (1): 2019
Munster Minor Hurling Championship (1): 2017 (c)

References

External link
Seán O'Leary-Hayes profile at the Cork GAA website

1999 births
Living people
Midleton hurlers
Cork inter-county hurlers